TACA may refer to:

 TACA International Airlines, a group of five Central American airlines
 The Autism Community in Action (formerly Talk About Curing Autism; same initialism)
 Turkish American Cultural Alliance

See also
 Taqa (disambiguation)
 Taka (disambiguation)
Tacca (disambiguation)